Daniel Isom was appointed St. Louis' 33rd Police Commissioner on October 6, 2008, and was St. Louis' third African-American police chief.

Isom took a leave of absence as the executive director of the Regional Justice Information Service, most commonly known as REJIS. in April 2021 due to his appointment as Interim Director of the Public Safety Department - City of St. Louis by Mayor Tishaura Jones.

He was previously St Louis' Police Commissioner & Chief from 2008 to 2013.

Career and education
He joined the Metropolitan Police Department on August 29, 1988.  During his career, he served in patrol, investigations, training, and internal affairs positions.  Promoted through the ranks, finally to Major in 2007, he worked as the Special Projects Assistant to the Police Commissioner until his promotion to Police Commissioner.

He previously served as an adjunct professor at Harris Stowe State University and an instructor at St. Louis Community College where he taught criminal justice, criminology, and public safety courses.

He has received an associate degree in Criminal Justice from Forest Park Community College-St. Louis, a Bachelor's, Master's and a Ph.D. in Criminology and Criminal Justice, all from the University of Missouri-St. Louis. He also holds a Masters in Public Administration from Saint Louis University.

He is a graduate of the FBI National Academy, the Police Executive Forum Senior Management Institute and the FBI National Executives Institute.

Eisenhower Fellowships selected Daniel Isom as a U.S.A. Eisenhower Fellow in 2013.  He traveled to Ireland and Germany for four weeks to study training and community policing in Europe.

The University of Chicago Institute of Politics selected him as an IOP Fellow in 2016. Isom delivered a series of seminars on police community relations and the future of policing in America.

Life after police chief
After retiring from the St. Louis Police Department, he took a teaching position on January 1, 2013, at the University of Missouri-St. Louis (UMSL).  He is now an E. Desmond Lee Professor of Policing and the Community in the Criminology and Criminal Justice Department at UMSL.

In August 2014, he was appointed as Director of the Missouri Department of Public Safety in the Cabinet of Governor Jay Nixon. On November 18, 2014, Missouri Gov. Jay Nixon appointed the Ferguson Commission – a volunteer group of 16 diverse community leaders to listen to and engage with area organizations, national thought leaders, institutions, experts and citizens.  Isom was appointed as a commissioner and served as the co-chair of the commission task force on police community relations.

References

1966 births
Living people
African-American police officers
Commissioners of the St. Louis Metropolitan Police Department
State cabinet secretaries of Missouri
African-American state cabinet secretaries
People from St. Louis
University of Missouri–St. Louis alumni
Saint Louis University alumni
Harris–Stowe State University faculty
University of Missouri–St. Louis people
21st-century African-American people
20th-century African-American people